is a Japanese professional footballer who plays as a midfielder for Mito HollyHock on loan from Yokohama FC.

Career
His father Sotaro is a former professional footballer, and a former manager of J3 League side SC Sagamihara.

References

External links

2000 births
Living people
Japanese footballers
Association football midfielders
Yokohama FC players
J1 League players
J2 League players